Mianpilun (also Romanized as Mīānpīlūn; also known as Mīānpalān) is a village in Kiyaras Rural District, in the Central District of Gotvand County, Khuzestan Province, Iran. At the 2006 census, its population was 276, in 51 families.

References 

Populated places in Gotvand County